Ewyas Harold Meadows is a nature reserve managed by Butterfly Conservation near the village of Ewyas Harold, Herefordshire, England.

References

Nature reserves in Herefordshire
Butterfly Conservation reserves
Meadows in Herefordshire